Stenophloeus ocularis is a species of beetle in the family Cerambycidae, and the only species in the genus Stenophloeus. It was described by Hintz in 1910.

References

Ancylonotini
Beetles described in 1910
Monotypic beetle genera